Arnold Whittaker (9 July 1879–1955) was an English footballer who played in the Football League for Blackburn Rovers.

References

1879 births
1955 deaths
English footballers
Association football forwards
English Football League players
Accrington Stanley F.C. (1891) players
Blackburn Rovers F.C. players
Bury F.C. players